Cameron Lisceous Humphreys-Grant (born 22 August 1998) is an English professional footballer who plays for Rotherham United as a centre-back.

Club career
Humphreys is a graduate of the youth system at Manchester City. In the summer of 2015, a 16 year old Humphreys travelled with the first team squad on their preseason tour and played in a friendly fixture against Real Madrid. Humphreys signed his first professional contract on 24 August, two days after his 17th birthday. On 30 January 2016, he made his competitive debut in a FA Cup game against Aston Villa. He replaced Nicolás Otamendi after 88 minutes in a 4–0 victory at Villa Park. Humphreys became a key member of both the Premier League 2 and UEFA Youth League sides at Manchester City.

In 2019, Humphreys joined Belgian side Zulte Waregem.

In July 2022, Humphreys agreed a 3 year deal with EFL Championship side Rotherham United, and joined them for pre-season in Croatia.

International career
Humphreys has represented England up to U19 level, making his debut for England U17 as a 14 year old.

Career statistics

References

External links
England profile at The FA
Player profile at Manchester City FC
 

1998 births
Living people
English footballers
England youth international footballers
Association football defenders
Manchester City F.C. players
S.V. Zulte Waregem players
Excelsior Rotterdam players
Rotherham United F.C. players
Belgian Pro League players
Eerste Divisie players
English Football League players
English expatriate footballers
Expatriate footballers in Belgium
English expatriate sportspeople in Belgium
Expatriate footballers in the Netherlands
English expatriate sportspeople in the Netherlands